The  is a rapid transit electric multiple unit operated by the Transportation Bureau City of Nagoya on the Nagoya Subway Tsurumai Line in Japan since 1977.

Formation
Originally delivered as 4-car sets, the trainsets were reformed into 6-car sets from 1993 as shown below with former cab cars inserted within the formations. Two surplus 3000 series cars were inserted into a later 3050 series set.

Original 4-car sets (1977–1993)

See also
 3050 series (since 1993)
 N3000 series (since 16 March 2012)

References

External links

 Nagoya Transportation Bureau technical details about the 3000 series 
 Nagoya Transportation Bureau description of the 3000 series 

Electric multiple units of Japan
3000 series
Train-related introductions in 1977
Hitachi multiple units
Nippon Sharyo multiple units
1500 V DC multiple units of Japan